Adolf Hjalmar von Sydow (22 August 1862 – 7 March 1932) was a Swedish lawyer and politician. 

He was knighted into the Order of Vasa in 1901.

Death
On 7 March 1932, in the so-called von Sydow murders, von Sydow was murdered, along with two of his employees, at his house in Stockholm. His son, Fredrik von Sydow, committed suicide later on the day of the murders and was the only suspect and the presumed murderer.

Selected publications
A. H. von Sydow, Om Stockholms rättskipning, polis och fångvård (Stockholm, 1897)
A. H. von Sydow, Öfversikt af stadsfiskalernas i Stockholm ställning från äldsta till närvarande tid (Stockholm, 1897)

References

1862 births
1932 deaths
Assassinated Swedish politicians
Male murder victims
Members of the Första kammaren
Swedish jurists
Swedish murder victims
Unsolved murders in Sweden